Robert Nathan Floyd (born October 20, 1943) is an American former Major League Baseball infielder. After his playing days ended, Floyd became a manager in Minor league baseball, and spent the next 30 years coaching.

Early years
On top of playing shortstop for the Southern California champion El Segundo High School baseball team, Floyd also quarterbacked El Segundo's football team his senior year. After two years at UCLA on a baseball scholarship, Floyd signed with the Baltimore Orioles as an amateur free agent in August .

Over five seasons in the Orioles' farm system, Floyd batted .259 with nineteen home runs and 252 runs batted in. He received his first call up to the majors in September . He went 1-for-9 (a double) with an RBI on a sacrifice fly.

Baltimore Orioles
Though he spent most of his minor league career at shortstop, Floyd made the Orioles'  opening day roster as a back-up infielder, receiving playing time at second and third as well. Floyd batted .219 with seven runs and just one RBI, also coming on a sac fly.

The Orioles won a franchise best 109 games to capture the American League East by nineteen games over the Detroit Tigers. While Floyd was on the post season roster, he did not appear in the 1969 American League Championship Series or the 1969 World Series.

The 1970 Orioles' bullpen struggled early in the season. With Gold glover Mark Belanger firmly entrenched at short, the Orioles had little use for a light hitting middle infielder. Floyd was traded from the Orioles to the Kansas City Royals for Moe Drabowsky before the trade deadline on June 15, .

Kansas City Royals
Floyd went 0-for-10 in a brief trial before being demoted to the Triple-A Omaha Royals. Before the demotion, he collected his first RBI of the season on a ground out.

He batted .292 with two home runs and 32 RBIs at Omaha to earn a return to the majors that September. In his first game back, Floyd got his first two hits of the season, and had a three-RBI game against the Chicago White Sox. The next day, he went 3-for-7 in a doubleheader with the ChiSox. His sixth inning single off Wilbur Wood in the second game drove in the tying and winning runs.

Floyd remained the club's regular shortstop over the remainder of the season. Albeit, with just eleven games left. In this short trial, Floyd batted .424 with eight RBIs and four runs scored.

During the off season, the Royals traded incumbent shortstop Jackie Hernandez to the Pittsburgh Pirates in a six player deal that netted the Royals shortstop Freddie Patek, whom they intended to use as their everyday shortstop. Floyd began the  season in Omaha, but received a call to the majors in late June. He batted .118 Through July, and was optioned back down. He again received a call up when rosters expanded in September, but batted only .163.

A stomach disorder suffered by Patek in spring training landed Floyd starting shortstop duties to start the  season. In nine games, Floyd batted .138 with two RBIs and one run scored, and committed two errors in 39 chances on the field. Once Patek was ready to return, Floyd was demoted to Omaha. He came back up in late June, and batted .190 with three RBIs and eight runs over the rest of the season.

References

External links

Bobby Floyd at Society for American Baseball Research

1943 births
Living people
Baltimore Orioles players
Baseball players from California
Elmira Pioneers players
Kansas City Royals players
Lynn Sailors players
Major League Baseball shortstops
New York Mets coaches
Norfolk Tides managers
Omaha Royals players
Rochester Red Wings players
Sportspeople from Hawthorne, California
Stockton Ports players
Tri-City Atoms players
UCLA Bruins baseball players
El Segundo High School alumni